Agrotis robustior is a moth of the family Noctuidae first described by Smith in 1899. It is found on the northern Great Plains of North America, the Prairie Provinces of Canada southward to South Dakota and Colorado.

The wingspan is about 40 mm.

External links

"Agrotis robustior (Smith 1899)". Moths of North Dakota. Retrieved November 15, 2020.

Agrotis
Moths of North America
Moths described in 1899